Gillingham (also ) is an unincorporated community located in the town of Marshall, Richland County, Wisconsin, United States. The post office was opened in 1880 with Hugh Morrow as the first postmaster. It was named for John Gillingham, who had encouraged Morrow to move to the area.

References

Unincorporated communities in Richland County, Wisconsin
Unincorporated communities in Wisconsin